Planet Tolex is a Canadian children's science fiction television series which aired on CBC Television from 1953 to 1954.

Premise
The fictional Planet Tolex of the series title was located in the Solar System, orbiting so that it was always opposite to the Earth, always causing its sightline with Tolex to be blocked by the Sun. The series' puppet-based characters were led by Bricol and Lexo and their fellow Tolex residents. Leo and Dora Velleman were the series creators and puppeteers.

Scheduling
This Montreal-produced half-hour series was broadcast on Tuesdays at 5:00 p.m. (Eastern) from 20 October 1953 to 27 April 1954. It was also aired on CBLT Toronto on the following Fridays at 5:00 p.m., except during 19 March to 9 April 1954 when it was rescheduled to 5:30 p.m. while school broadcasts were aired at 5:00 p.m.

References

External links
 

CBC Television original programming
1950s Canadian children's television series
1953 Canadian television series debuts
1954 Canadian television series endings
Black-and-white Canadian television shows
Canadian children's science fiction television series
Canadian television shows featuring puppetry